Carroll High School is a senior high school in Monroe, Louisiana, United States and a part of Monroe City Schools.

Athletics
Carroll High athletics competes in the LHSAA.

Championships
Football championships
(4) State Championships: 1953, 1961, 1962, 1968

Football semi finalist in 1992 (lost to Hahnville)

Produced James "Shack" Harris, the first black quarterback to start in an NFL season opening game.

References

External links
 Carroll High School

Monroe, Louisiana
Schools in Ouachita Parish, Louisiana
Public high schools in Louisiana